Manifaxine (developmental code name GW-320,659) is a norepinephrine–dopamine reuptake inhibitor developed by GlaxoSmithKline through structural modification of radafaxine, an isomer of hydroxybupropion and one of the active metabolites of bupropion. Manifaxine was researched for treatment of attention deficit hyperactivity disorder (ADHD) and obesity and was found to be safe, reasonably effective, and well-tolerated for both applications. However, no results were reported following these initial trials and development was discontinued.

Synthesis

The Grignard reaction between 3,5-difluorobenzonitrile [64248-63-1] (1) and ethylmagnesium bromide gives 3,5-difluoropropiophenone [135306-45-5] (2). Halogenation with molecular bromine occurs at the alpha-keto position providing 2-bromo-3',5'-difluoropropiophenone [135306-46-6] (3). Intermolecular ring formation with DL-Alaninol (2-Aminopropanol) [6168-72-5] completed the synthesis of Manifaxine (4).

See also
 3,5-Difluoromethcathinone
 3-Fluorophenmetrazine

References

Fluoroarenes
GSK plc brands
Substituted amphetamines
Phenylmorpholines
Norepinephrine–dopamine reuptake inhibitors
Stimulants
Tertiary alcohols